The Hand of Irulegi is a late Iron Age archaeological artifact unearthed in 2021 during excavations in the archaeological site of , next to the medieval castle of Irulegi, located in the municipality of Aranguren, to the south of Pamplona in Navarre, Spain. The bronze artifact has the distinctive shape of a right hand with extended fingers. It has five separate strings of letters, probably corresponding to five or more words, carved on the side that represents the back of a hand. It predates the earliest known attestation so far of a Basque word (with the exception of proper names) by around 1000 years.

Context and form 
The "Hand of Irulegi" has been a working title assigned to the archaeological find. It dates from the 1st century BC. At the time, during the period of Sertorian Wars, the native population took sides and the settlement came under attack, extending the fire throughout the fortified town as a result. As outlined by Juantxo Agirre Mauleon, secretary of the Science Society Aranzadi, which conducted the excavation, the roof of the dwelling collapsed, which allowed for the preservation of archaeological remains under the debris. The hand may have hung from the door, where it provided protection for the house. According to a report in The Economist, 'such striking hand-shaped designs are unknown in Spanish or neighbouring cultures'.

Inscription 
The text can be transliterated from Northeastern Iberian script as:

The first string of letters reads , echoed in the present-day Basque language by the widely used , a compound word meaning "(of) good fortune(s)". The word is accompanied by at least four other words whose meaning is not as apparent. The Hand of Irulegi is the oldest surviving example of the Basque language, written in Iberian script, and adapted to allow for the language's own characteristics. The inscription contains a -shaped letter that has only been found in Vasconic areas, previously seen on two coins.

Discovery 
Although announced on 14 November 2022, with the intervention of the regional president of Navarre, the unearthing goes back to June 2021, when the excavating team led by Mattin Aiestaran found it. The piece was then handed over to researchers for their consideration, who have hailed it as highly important.

On 18 January 2022, during the cleaning process, Carmen Usua, the restorer, noticed that there was writing present. Epigraphers found that the hand had a natural downward position.

See also 
 Hamsa 
 Iturissa 
 Iruña-Veleia 
 Aquitanian language 
 Proto-Basque language 
 History of the Basque language
 Paleohispanic scripts

Notes

References

External links 

1st-century BC works
2021 archaeological discoveries
Iron Age Europe
Basque history
Navarre culture
Basque language
Iberian writing
Bronze objects
Hand